Kira Carroll "Kiki" Rice (born January 14, 2004) is an American college basketball player for the UCLA Bruins of the Pac-12 Conference. She played for Sidwell Friends School at the high school level, where she was one of the top recruits in her class and earned national player of the year honors as a senior.

High school career
Rice played basketball for Sidwell Friends School in Washington, D.C. As a freshman, she averaged 19.2 points, 9.4 rebounds and 6.6 assists per game, leading her team to the semifinals of the state tournament. In her sophomore season, Rice averaged 26.8 points, 10.7 rebounds, 4.7 assists and 2.3 steals per game, helping her team reach the District of Columbia State Athletic Association (DCSAA) Class AA title game. She was named D.C. Gatorade Player of the Year and DMV Student-Athlete of the Year by NBC Sports Washington. Rice did not play in her junior year after the Independent School League (ISL) canceled winter sports activities amid the COVID-19 pandemic. In her senior season, she led Sidwell Friends to a 28–0 record and the No. 1 national ranking by ESPN and MaxPreps, averaging 15.8 points, seven rebounds, 5.1 assists and 2.6 steals per game. Her team won the ISL tournament and its first DCSAA Class AA title. Rice earned Gatorade Athlete of the Year, Gatorade National Player of the Year, Morgan Wootten National Player of the Year and Naismith Prep Player of the Year honors. She played in the McDonald's All-American Game, where she shared the MVP award with Gabriela Jaquez.

In addition to basketball, Rice played soccer for Sidwell Friends School at the forward and midfielder positions. In her freshman season, she led the team to ISL and DCSAA tournament titles. Rice was named D.C. Gatorade Player of the Year and DCSAA Player of the Year after recording 42 goals and 12 assists. As a senior, Rice repeated as D.C. Gatorade Player of the Year, helping Sidwell Friends win the DCSAA tournament, and recorded 15 goals and nine assists. She was named MaxPreps Athlete of the Year for her performance in basketball and soccer.

Recruiting
Rice was considered a five-star recruit, the second-best player and the top point guard in the 2022 class by ESPN. On November 4, 2021, she committed to playing college basketball for UCLA over offers from UConn, Stanford, Arizona and Duke. Rice became the highest-ranked recruit in program history. She was drawn to UCLA by the opportunity to help lead a team to its first Final Four and national championship.

College career
On November 7, 2022, Rice made her debut for UCLA, recording 12 points and seven assists in an 84–48 win over Cal Poly.

National team career
Rice helped the United States under-16 national team win a gold medal at the 2019 FIBA Under-16 Americas Championship in Chile, where she averaged 7.2 points, 4.7 rebounds and 3.7 assists per game. She led the United States under-18 national team to a gold medal at the 2022 FIBA Under-18 Americas Championship in Argentina. Rice earned tournament MVP honors after averaging 14.3 points, four rebounds and four assists per game.

In 3x3 basketball, Rice won a gold medal with the United States at the FIBA 3x3 Under-18 World Cup in Hungary.

Personal life
Rice's father, John, and brother, Teo, have both played college basketball for Yale. Her mother, Andrea, was a member of the tennis team at the same college. Rice's aunt is diplomat Susan Rice, and she is a cousin of former NBA player Allan Houston.

On October 31, 2022, Rice signed a name, image and likeness deal with Jordan Brand, becoming the first athlete to do so.

References

2004 births
Living people
American women's basketball players
Basketball players from San Francisco
People from Bethesda, Maryland
Point guards
Sidwell Friends School alumni
McDonald's High School All-Americans